Women's handball at the 2016 South Asian Games were held in Guwahati, India from 10 to 16 February 2016.

Results
All times are India Standard Time (UTC+05:30)

Group stages

Group A

Group B

Final round

Semifinals

Bronze medal match

Gold medal match

Final standing

References

External links 
 results page of the 2016 SAG

Handball at the 2016 South Asian Games